The women's combined took place on February 14, 2002.

Results
The results of the women's combined event in Alpine skiing at the 2002 Winter Olympics.

References

External links
Official Report
result

Combined